"Now I'm in It" is a song by American band Haim, released as a single on October 30, 2019.

Background
In an interview with The Guardian, the band members talked about two upcoming songs titled "Hallelujah" and "Now I'm in It", with the latter having been announced as their next single. The song was described as a "breathy pop ballad". About the song's lyrics, Danielle revealed that "people think Now I’m in It is a break-up song because I sing: ‘We can’t be friends’ but I’m talking about me and my mind. It was gnarly and I was not OK with myself". Shortly before release, Danielle revealed that the song was about going through a bout of depression.

Critical reception
Abby Jones of Pitchfork thought that the song was a "far cry from the minimalistic groove" of their previous single "Summer Girl" and even "much of Haim's discography". She further compared the bassline to Taylor Swift's "Style". Jones concluded that "though the song does feel a little more Haimy with some organic instrumentals, a glaring awkwardness results from the otherwise electro-pop aesthetic".

Music video
The music video premiered on YouTube on October 30, 2019 and was directed by long-time collaborator Paul Thomas Anderson. It primarily focuses on a day in Danielle's life and its recurring monotony. Throughout the video, the singer is seen working at a diner, getting carried on a stretcher and passing through a car wash before emerging from the fog of her depression with her sisters by her side.

Media usage
The song was featured in the seventh episode of the 2022 Marvel Studios and Disney+ show She-Hulk: Attorney at Law.

Credits and personnel
Credits adapted from Tidal.

Musicians
 Danielle Haim – vocals, acoustic and electric guitar, conga
 Alana Haim – vocals, conga
 Este Haim – vocals, bass
 Rostam Batmanglij – electric guitar, piano, synthesizer, drum and synthesizer programming
 Ariel Rechtshaid – synthesizer, drum and synthesizer programming
 Buddy Ross – synthesizer

Technical
 Ariel Rechtshaid – engineering
 Rostam Batmanglij – engineering
 Dalton Ricks – engineering
 John DeBold – engineering
 Manny Marroquin – mixing
 Jasmine Chen – assistant recording engineering
 Matt DiMona – assistant recording engineering
 Emily Lazar – mastering engineering
 Chris Allgood – assistant mastering engineering

Charts

Release history

References

2019 singles
2019 songs
Haim (band) songs
Songs written by Danielle Haim
Songs written by Este Haim
Songs written by Alana Haim
Songs written by Rostam Batmanglij